Leif Gotfredsen (28 June 1934 – 30 June 2006) was a Canadian rower. He competed in the men's single sculls event at the 1964 Summer Olympics.

References

1934 births
2006 deaths
Canadian male rowers
Olympic rowers of Canada
Rowers at the 1964 Summer Olympics
People from Herning Municipality
Pan American Games medalists in rowing
Pan American Games silver medalists for Canada
Rowers at the 1967 Pan American Games
 
 Nina